Ron White (born December 18, 1956) is an American stand-up comedian, actor and author, best known as a charter member of the Blue Collar Comedy Tour. Nicknamed "Tater Salad", he is the author of the book I Had the Right to Remain Silent But I Didn't Have the Ability, which appeared on the New York Times best seller list.

Biography
White was born in Fritch, Texas on December 18, 1956. He joined the U.S. Navy at age 17 and served on the auxiliary rescue and salvage ship USS Conserver near the end of the Vietnam War. Before pursuing comedy professionally, White briefly lived in Mexico, where he bought a pottery factory.

From January 2000 through March 2003, White toured with Jeff Foxworthy, Bill Engvall, and Larry the Cable Guy as part of the Blue Collar Comedy Tour – a show that sold out across the United States in over 90 cities and grossed over $15 million. He made seven guest appearances on  Blue Collar TV. In 2005, The WB Television Network aired the pilot for The Ron White Show, a variety show that combined a number of celebrity cameos, cartoons, and sketches. He taped several episodes of The Gong Show with Dave Attell as one of the celebrity judges. White has appeared in the TV shows Kath & Kim, Reno 911!, 12 Miles of Bad Road, the films Sex and the City 2 and Horrible Bosses, and a cameo in a Rascal Flatts music video, "Why Wait".

White is known for drinking Scotch as part of his act, as well as smoking cigars or cigarettes. He stated during his You Can't Fix Stupid show, "Somebody asked what I was drinking. If the company that made the stuff I was drinking was paying me, I'd have it in their bottle and not mine. But it's the kind of scotch that people drink that are going to die penniless. It's good though!" In 2009, Comedy Central released White's stand up DVD Behavioral Problems.

In 2010, Ron White and producer Michael Blakey formed Organica Music Group (OMG), a label that promotes both emerging and established musicians and comedians. OMG indicated that it would release all of White's future DVDs and CDs. In November 2015, White announced that he was running for President of the United States as an independent candidate in 2016. In 2016, White starred as Phil, veteran road manager for the fictional Staton-House Band, in the Showtime series Roadies.

Personal life
White was married to Lori Brice from 1981 to 1993 and they had one son, Marshall. He was later married to Barbara Dobbs from 2004 to 2008. In 2013, he married singer Margo Rey; as of 2017 the two are no longer together, with White claiming that they were never legally married. On August 6, 2019, a ruling came down in L.A. Superior Court where a judge sided with Rey and declared the couple was in a common-law marriage under Texas law.

White stopped drinking alcohol sometime in early 2021. He credits the consultation of a hypnotherapist and the use of ayahuasca with his abstinence.

Awards and recognition
April 27, 2009, was designated "Ron White Day" in the State of Texas by Texas legislative officials. White received the Armed Forces Foundation's "Patriot Award" in March 2009 for his work in raising money to help wounded soldiers. He also held benefit shows for Hurricane Katrina relief. He was Grammy-nominated for Best Comedy Album in 2007 & 2014.

Comedy releases
Besides the Blue Collar Comedy Tour CDs and films, White has released seven solo projects to date.

Solo works
 Tater Salad a.k.a. Busted in Des Moines (1990) (CD)
 Drunk in Public (2003) (CD)
 They Call Me "Tater Salad" (2004) (DVD)
 You Can't Fix Stupid (2006) (DVD and CD)
 Behavioral Problems (2009) (DVD)
 A Little Unprofessional (2013) (DVD and digital download)
 If You Quit Listening, I’ll Shut Up (2018) (Netflix)

He has appeared on the following compilation albums:
 Redneck Comedy Roundup (2005)
 Comedy Central Presents Southern Gents of Comedy (2006)
 Ron White, Jeff Foxworthy & Bill Engvall: Live from Las Vegas (2004)
 Redneck Kings of Comedy (2005)

Discography

References

External links

 Official website
 
 Organica Music Group, Ron White and Michael Blakey's record label
 WTF Podcast Episode 470: Ron White
 Radio Labyrinth 217: Ron White Doug Stanhope

American stand-up comedians
American male comedians
American male film actors
American male television actors	
Capitol Records artists
Comedians from Texas
Male actors from Texas
People from Fritch, Texas
United States Navy sailors
1956 births
20th-century American comedians
21st-century American comedians
21st-century American male actors
Living people